The New Democracy Party (NDP) was a political party in Lithuania.

History
The party was originally named the Lithuanian Women's Party (Lietuvos moterų partija) and first ran in the 1996 parliamentary elections. It received 3.7% of the vote and won a single seat.

Prior to the 2000 elections the party was renamed the New Democracy Party. It contested the elections as part of the Social-Democratic Coalition of Algirdas Brazauskas. The coalition won 51 seats, of which three were taken by the NDP.

In 2001 the party merged with the Lithuanian Peasants Party to form the Union of Peasants and New Democracy Parties.

References

External links
Official website, archived as for December, 2000

Defunct political parties in Lithuania
Political parties disestablished in 2001
Feminist parties in Europe